Boodlea is a genus of green algae in the family Boodleaceae.

Etymology 
Boodlea was named after the British botanist and public servant Leonard Alfred Boodle in J. Linn. Soc., Bot. vol.25 on pages 243-245 in 1889.

References

External links

Cladophorales genera
Boodleaceae